{{Infobox concert tour
| concert_tour_name = The Beginning Massive Stadium Tour
| image             = BEPBeginningTour.jpg
| image_size        = 200px
| image_caption     = Promotional poster for the concert in Madrid
| artist            = The Black Eyed Peas
| album             = The Beginning
| start_date        = 
| end_date          = 
| number_of_legs    = 1
| number_of_shows   = 1 in Asia9 in Europe6 in North America2 in South America18 Total
| last_tour         = The E.N.D. World Tour(2009–10)
| this_tour         = The Beginning Massive Stadium(2011)
| next_tour         = Masters Of The Sun Tour(2018)
}}The Beginning Massive Stadium Tour' was the fourth concert tour by American hip hop group The Black Eyed Peas, in support of the group's sixth studio album The Beginning'' (2010). It was the last tour to feature Fergie as a member of the group, as well as the last before the group's official hiatus, lasting until 2015.

Opening acts 
 David Guetta (Paris and Madrid, 22 June & 14 July)
 Natalia Kills (Paris, 24 & 25 June, Düsseldorf 28 June)
 Stromae (Paris, 24 & 25 June)
 Parade (Cheadle, Staffordshire, 6 July)
 Labrinth (Cheadle, Staffordshire, 6 July)
 LMFAO (Cheadle, Staffordshire, 6 July)
 Tinie Tempah (Düsseldorf, 28 June)
 Diva (Asunción, 15 November)
 Sean Kingston (Miami, 23 November)
 Jason DeRulo (Miami, 23 November)
 T-Pain (Miami, 23 November)
 Cee Lo Green (Miami, 23 November)
 Queen Latifah (Miami, 23 November)

Set list 

 "Rock That Body"
 "Meet Me Halfway"
 "Just Can't Get Enough"
 "The Best One Yet (The Boy)"
 "Bebot" (
 "Don't Phunk with My Heart"
 "My Humps"
 "Shut Up"
 "Don't Stop the Party"
 "Imma Be"
 "Joints & Jam"
 "Glamorous" / "Big Girls Don't Cry"  
 "OMG" / "Sweet Dreams (Are Made of This)" / "Smells Like Teen Spirit" / "Gettin' Over You (Sidney Samson Remix)" / "When Love Takes Over (Electro Radio Edit)" / "White Lines (Don't Don't Do It)" / "Thriller" / "Otherside" / "Song 2" / "T.H.E. (The Hardest Ever)" 
 "Party Rock Anthem"
 "Freestyle Break"
 "Let's Get It Started"
 "Pump It"
 "Light Up the Night"
 "Where Is the Love?"
 "We Can Be Anything" (
Encore
 "Boom Boom Pow"
 "The Time (Dirty Bit)"
 "I Gotta Feeling"

Source:

Tour dates 

Music festivals and other miscellaneous performances
This concert is a part of the Wireless Festival concert series.
This concert is a part of the Oxegen concert series.
This concert is a part of the iHeartRadio concert series.
This concert is a part of the SWU Music & Arts concert series.

References

2011 concert tours
Black Eyed Peas concert tours